Bruce McGregor Davis (born October 5, 1942) is a former member of the Manson Family who has been described as Charles Manson's "right-hand man".

Early life

Bruce Davis was born on October 5, 1942, in Monroe, Louisiana.  Davis was editor of his high school yearbook and attended the University of Tennessee for three years.  In 1962, he traveled to California. In 1967, Davis met Charles Manson and his associates Mary Brunner, Lynette Fromme, and Patricia Krenwinkel in Oregon.

Davis lived in London from November 1968 to April 1969 while working at the Church of Scientology headquarters."

Manson Family murders 

Davis was present when, in July 1969, Manson cut Gary Hinman's left ear. Hinman was subsequently stabbed to death by Bobby Beausoleil, although neither Manson nor Davis were present when Hinman was murdered. In late August, Davis did participate in the murder of Spahn's Ranch hand Donald "Shorty" Shea. Davis was present when, on November 5, 1969, John Philip Haught aka "Zero", allegedly killed himself playing Russian roulette.

At some point after these events, Davis went into hiding, ultimately turning himself in on December 2, 1970.

Conviction and prison

In 1972, Davis was convicted in Los Angeles County of two counts of first-degree murder for the killings of Hinman and Shea, conspiracy to commit murder, and robbery. California having recently abolished the death penalty, he was sentenced to life imprisonment. He began his sentence on April 21, 1972. He became a preacher in the prison chapel and has kept a clean disciplinary record since 1980. He was found suitable for parole in 2010, 2012, 2014, 2015, 2017, 2019, and 2021. In each case, the sitting Governor either ordered a review or reversed the decision. In July 2022, the three-member panel board denied him parole. His lawyer said that the panel highlighted Davis's "lack of empathy". He is currently imprisoned at San Quentin State Prison where he is serving his life sentence.

References 

1942 births
Living people
American people convicted of murder
American prisoners sentenced to life imprisonment
American former Scientologists
People convicted of murder by California
20th-century American criminals
Criminals from California
Criminals from Louisiana
Manson Family
Prisoners sentenced to life imprisonment by California